La Paz is an administrative neighborhood of Madrid belonging to the district of Fuencarral-El Pardo. It is home to the largest hospital in Madrid, Hospital Universitario La Paz.

References

Wards of Madrid
Fuencarral-El Pardo